Apperian, Inc. was a Boston-based software company, that provided a mobile application management platform that does not require app code modifications or software development kits (SDKs).

Apperian sold cloud-based or on-premises software through a privately branded enterprise app store to employees and contracted workers without requiring the device to be managed.

Mobile application management

Apperian technology was intended to address problems with devices such as iPads used in businesses. Apperian's mobile application management (MAM) platform was designed for business administrators to secure, manage, distribute and monitor enterprise mobile apps for the iOS operating system on Apple iPhone and iPad devices, Android OS devices, and Windows Phone devices. The platform could also be used for user acceptance testing of business-to-consumer and business-to-business mobile apps. Apperian's customers included NVIDIA, New Balance, Nationwide Mutual Insurance, and the US Department of Homeland Security.

Company

Privately held and based in Boston, Apperian was founded in January 2009 as a third-party developer of enterprise iPhone apps before announcing EASE in 2010. One of its founders, Chuck Goldman, was the head of Apple's professional services division and its iPhone Enterprise Beta Program.
Apperian raised $1.9 million from angel investors in July 2009.
They closed a $9.5 million venture capitalround of financing in early 2011 from North Bridge Venture Partners, Bessemer Venture Partners, Kleiner Perkins Caufield & Byers’ iFund, CommonAngels and LaunchCapital. Apperian closed a $12.4 million round in March 2012 from original investors, and added an additional strategic investment from Intel Capital bringing the company's total financing to $28 million. In 2015, the company reported that it doubled new bookings year-over-year, increased new business pipeline by over 300% and delivered over 1.5 million enterprise app downloads.

In January 2017, Apperian was acquired by Arxan Technologies for an undisclosed amount. It now operates as Digital.ai App Management.

References

Companies based in Boston
Privately held companies based in Massachusetts
Software companies based in Massachusetts
2009 establishments in Massachusetts
Defunct software companies of the United States
Software companies established in 2009
Software companies disestablished in 2017
2017 mergers and acquisitions
2017 disestablishments in Massachusetts